Qormi Football Club is a Maltese football club from the city of Qormi, that currently plays in the Maltese National Amateur League.

History
Qormi Football Club was founded in 1961 after the amalgamation of Qormi Youngsters (from the parish of St. Sebastian) and Qormi United (from the parish of St. George), which is from where the club acquired its motto Fl-Għaqda s-Saħħa,. The first club from Qormi dates back to the 1920s. The club thus celebrated the 50th anniversary in 2011. Qormi Football Club is affiliated with the Malta Football Association (MFA) which is the main football body in Malta. The Qormi FC Youth Nursery is a sub-committee of Qormi FC and almost 200 youngsters are affiliated with the nursery.

Qormi Football Grounds (Thomaso Grounds) are situated in Valletta Road, Qormi and the amenities includes pitches, a conference hall, fitness centre, bar and the Qormi FC Youth Nursery Headquarters. Qormi's official colours are Yellow and Black. Qormi's biggest arch rivals are Zebbug Rangers from neighbouring town of Zebbug, Malta.

The club has spent some of its seasons yo-yo-ing from one division to another, but has recently started to build a more solid pace, progressing slowly but steadily to the upper divisions. Season 2007–08 was the best ever season in the club's recent history. Qormi clinched a second position finish in the Maltese First Division, following a hardly fought play-off penalty win against Mosta, which acquired the club's accession to the Maltese Premier League. Season 2008–09 will be the first season that Qormi will spend in the highest echelons of Maltese football since the old First Division was renamed the Premier League. To prepare for their first Maltese Premier League campaign, Qormi brought in ten new signings and gave a new look to the club's image. The team performed well in pre-season friendlies. In a press release, the club's committee expressed its aim to stay in top flight and possibly even making it to the Championship Pool. Nevertheless, Qormi still struggled against relegation like most newly promoted teams in the Premier League. Promotion was only achieved on the last day of the league, with a 2–0 win on Hamrun Spartans F.C. Season 2009–10 saw Qormi achieving a historical stint in the Maltese top-flight, as well as in the FA Trophy. The success was especially aided with arguably the best signing in the club's history, Camilo. Camilo finished top scorer in the league with 24 goals in 22 appearances where Qormi finished in the third place. Qormi then had to play a decider match to determine the taker of the Europa League spot for the next season, a match which Qormi lost to Sliema 0–2. Qormi also could have achieved a spot through the cup, however, albeit making it to the final, Qormi lost to Valletta 1–2.

After the departure of Camilo and other players, as well as coaches Jesmond Zerafa and Vincent Carbonaro, Qormi faced a difficult season the year after. Season 2010–11 saw Qormi retaining Stefan Giglio and Matthew Bartolo, and acquiring the services of George Mallia, Belgian Jason Vandelannoite, Nigerian Abubakar Bello-Osagie, South Korean Kang Ho-Jung in the first half of the season, and Brazilian Josue, Greek Christos Karamanolis, Guinea-Bissau Ibraima Sumaila Vaz Sani, and most notably, the Maltese national football team captain Michael Mifsud, in the second half of the season. Also notable was the change in technical staff at the beginning of the season, with Stephen Azzopardi heading the team. During the season, Azzopardi utilised various youth players coming up from the Youth Nursery. Qormi managed to finish eighth (only one team was relegated in Season 2010–11 however).

Qormi kept struggling season after season, with the occasional fluke in the Maltese FA Trophy. Qormi reached the final three times, all as runners-up, in 2009–10, 2011–12 and 2012–13.

The yellow-blacks celebrated their 50th anniversary during season 2011–12. On the pitch, as already mentioned, Qormi reached the final match of the Maltese cup competition, while holding various celebration activities and issuing various memorabilia, including a book relating history of football in Qormi between 1961 and 2011.

The club kept on struggling to avoid relegation, while enthusiasm for football in the city of Qormi began to wane. Qormi finished 8th in season 2014–15, once again clearing itself from relegation on the last matchday.

It was then revealed that the club had financial problems during an Extraordinary General Meeting held on August 13, 2015. The members agreed that the executive committee had to revisit the club's budgets prior to the 2015–16 season.

Kit Evolution

Achievements
Maltese First Division Champions: 2017–18
Maltese First Division Runners-up: 2007–08
Maltese Second Division Champions: 1968–69, 1972–73, 2005–06
Maltese Second Division Section Winners: 1988–89
Maltese Second Division Runners-up: 1977–78
Maltese Second Division Knock-Out Finalists: 1966–67, 1972–73
Maltese Second Division Sons of Malta Cup Champions: 1969–70, 1973–74
Maltese Third Division Section Winners: 1962–63, 1963–64, 1982–83, 1988–89
Maltese Third Division Play-offs Winners: 2003–04
Maltese Third Division Knock-Out Winners: 1962–63
Maltese Cup Runners-up: 2009–10, 2011–12, 2012–13

Current squad

Players

Club Officials and Coaching Staff 2022-20223

Club Officials and committee members (Elected 4 May2022)
 Vice-President: Robert Farrugia
 Secretary: Redeno Apap
 Assistant Secretary: Christian Fenech
 Treasurer: Stephen Pace
 Ass.Treasurer:Jamie Zammit
 Member (Supporters):"' Kerstin Gatt

Coaching staff
 Coach:Lydon Fenech
 Assistant Coach: Fatos Daja
 Team manager:  Jurgen Mifsud

Managers
 Jesmond Zerafa (2007–10)
 Vince Carbonaro (July 1, 2009 – July 1, 2010)
 Stephen Azzopardi (June 7, 2010 – Oct 18, 2012)
 Jesmond Zerafa (Oct 19, 2012 – June 21, 2013)
 Tommaso Volpi (June 22, 2013 – Dec 20, 2013)
 Karel Zeman (Jan 3, 2014–2014)
 Josef Mansueto (2014 – February 2, 2015)
 Mark Miller (February 4, 2015 – May 15, 2015)
 Jesmond Zerafa (July 1, 2015 – October 15, 2015)
 Johann Scicluna (October 22, 2015 - May 2016 )
 Lydon Fenech (July 01, 2022 - Present)

Seasons
This is a list of seasons played by Qormi Football Club in Maltese football, from 2004 to the present day.

References

External links
MaltaFootball Club Profile
SoccerWay Club Profile

 
Football clubs in Malta
Association football clubs established in 1961
1961 establishments in Malta